The Jens Nielson House is a historic house in Bluff, Utah. It was built in 1890 for Jens Nielson, an immigrant from Denmark who converted to the Church of Jesus Christ of Latter-day Saints and arrived in the United States with his wife, née Elsie Rasmussen, in 1856. Nielson moved to San Juan County, Utah in 1879, and he served as the bishop of Bluffdale for 26 years. His house was designed in the Gothic Revival and Vernacular Victorian styles. It has been listed on the National Register of Historic Places since February 22, 1982.

References

National Register of Historic Places in San Juan County, Utah
Gothic Revival architecture in Utah
Houses completed in 1890
1890 establishments in Utah Territory